Norwood is a suburb of Adelaide, about  east of the Adelaide city centre. The suburb is in the City of Norwood Payneham & St Peters, whose predecessor was the oldest South Australian local government municipality.

History

Before British colonisation of South Australia and subsequent European settlement, Norwood was inhabited by one of the groups who later collectively became known as the Kaurna peoples.

Early settler Edward Stephens, who arrived in the colony in 1839, wrote: "Norwood and Kent Town were unknown then. The site of the present Norwood was then a magnificent gum forest, with an undergrowth of kangaroo grass, too high in places for a man to see over; in fact persons lost their way in going from Adelaide to Kensington in those days, through attempting a short or near cut across the country".

Norwood is named after Norwood, then a village south of London. The new village east of Adelaide was first laid out in 1847. The former City of Kensington and Norwood was the first outside of the City of Adelaide to receive the right to set up their own municipal corporation. The charter of the town was given on 7 July 1853 by the Governor, Sir Henry Young.

Trams

The first permanent street-based public transport service in Adelaide was provided in Norwood and Kensington, and these suburbs were also the first to be served by electric trams. The Adelaide and Suburban Tramway Company, the first horse-drawn tram company, started laying tracks from the City of Adelaide to Norwood and Kensington in 1877, with the first trams running in June 1878. The Adelaide and Suburban Tramway Company was acquired by the Municipal Tramways Trust, and the Kensington line converted to an electric tramway in 1909. The interim Kensington terminus was at The Parade/Gurrs Road intersection, before being extended, as part of the network of Adelaide trams, to serve the recently created reserve up The Parade at Kensington Gardens.

Until 1952, the service was linked in with the other eastern suburbs tramlines and terminated in the city, but in that year it was "though routed" with trams running to Henley Beach. The tramway closed in February 1957.

Jubilee Cycling Arena

In February 1951 the Jubilee Cycling Arena, aka Norwood Velodrome, opened on Osmond Terrace. It was a steeply banked concrete velodrome, with six laps to the mile, designed by Eddie Smith. During the summer, there were races held every Friday night. It became a popular spot for keen cyclists, and was also used as a venue for square dancing in the 1950s.

In 1970, residents organised protests and a green ban in order to stop the destruction of the Norwood Velodrome for high-rise apartments. However, Norwood Council sold the velodrome and surrounding land to real estate developers in 1981.

Geography and landmarks
The suburb consists of four segments, being divided into north and south by the major thoroughfare of The Parade and east and west by Osmond Terrace.  It is bounded on the south by Kensington Road on the north by Magill Road, on the east by Portrush Road and on the west by Fullarton Road. It is a leafy suburb, with streets lined with plane trees.

First Creek and Second Creek once flowed through the suburb, but First Creek is only visible between Edward Street and Birrell Street, and both creeks are mostly underground in concrete tunnels.

Osmond Terrace is a street with a wide grass, median strip featuring a prominent war memorial commemorating ANZAC soldiers who fought in the first and second World Wars, created by architect H.F.R. Culley. The median strip also features sculptures from local artists, and rose gardens. There is a sculpture of the first Italian to arrive in the new colony of South Australia in 1839, Antonio Giannoni (1814–1883), who worked as a cab driver in Norwood, and whose son, Peter Gannoni, became mayor in 1920. The memorial bust, created by Wandrina Douglas-Boers, was unveiled in November 1993.

One of the most visible landmarks in Norwood is the Clayton Wesley Uniting Church, at the eastern end of The Parade, on the north-east corner of Portrush Road. Actually located in Beulah Park, the church and spire that are visible along the road from Norwood was built in 1883, although an earlier building (still behind the present church) was built in 1856. The Norwood Town Hall is on the north-western corner of The Parade and George Street.

Demography

Norwood attracted many European migrants post-World War II, in particular Italians. In the 2016 Australian census, 4.1% of the population spoke Italian at home, with Greek coming a close second at 3%. By the 2016 Australian census, the top language other than English spoken at home was Mandarin Chinese, at 3.6%, while 3.2% of the population spoke Italian and 2.8% Greek.

The top ancestries in 2016 were English, at 26.3% and Australian, at 17%. Only 64.4% were born in Australia, while 43.2% had both parents born in Australia.

Sport

Norwood Oval

Norwood Oval,  known as the Coopers Stadium, on The Parade, is home to the Norwood Redlegs, a South Australian National Football League (Australian Rules Football) team It also hosts some AFL Women's (national league) matches, including the Adelaide Crows.  It is the former home of Adelaide Bite, an Australian Baseball League team .

Norwood Cycling Club

The Norwood Cycling Club (NCC) is the largest cycling club in South Australia, with 380 members , and its 1883 foundation date makes it the oldest such club in the southern hemisphere. It was founded as the Norwood Cycle and Motor Club, and its official opening was at Kensington Oval, a bit further up The Parade in the suburb of Kensington, on 4 February 1884. Sir Edwin Smith was a foundation member and patron of the club, which became incorporated in 1918, after it had bought land and built clubrooms at Port Noarlunga. After the Jubilee Cycling Arena was built in Norwood in 1951, the club's members used to race there, and in 1965 the club raised money to concrete the track. Its clubrooms opened in George Street in 1975.

Former members of the club include many champions, including Jack Bobridge, Luke Roberts, Tim Roe, Alexis Rhodes, Tiffany Cromwell, Patrick Jonker, Michael Turtur, David Solari (son of Nino Solari), Wayne McCarney, Charlie Walsh and Jay Sweet.

Each year the club promotes four major cycling events:
the Noarlunga Road race (since 1919);
the Burra 2-day Classic;
the Tour of the Riverland (established 1975); and
the AlphutteClassic Handicap.

NCC is affiliated with Cycling SA, which is in turn affiliated with the national parent body of the state bodies, Cycling Australia.

Attractions
Norwood is known for its many restaurants and shops selling fashion and goods of all kinds. It also plays host to a variety of events and festivals throughout the year.

Odeon Theatre
The Odeon Theatre is on the corner of The Parade and Queen Street. Originally the Star Theatre, it was designed as a picture theatre by Sydney architects Kaberry & Chard (who also designed the Thebarton Theatre and many other cinemas across Australia) in association with Chris A. Smith. It opened in 1923, with its entrance on The Parade. The operator was D. Clifford Theatres (formerly Star Theatres) by 1946. Later it was taken over by Greater Union Cinemas and renamed the Odeon Theatre (also known as Odeon Norwood). It closed as a cinema, reopening in 1986 as a live theatre specialising in children's productions. The entrance was moved around the corner onto Queen Street, and the original foyer converted into restaurant,  St Louis dessert bar.

, the Odeon is home to Australian Dance Theatre, which offers dance classes to adults. The venue is hired out for various performing arts events, such as the Adelaide Festival, Adelaide Fringe and State Theatre Company of South Australia performances.

Notable buildings

Norwood Town Hall was heritage-listed on the SA Heritage Register in November 1985.
Norwood Library is located on 110 The Parade, near the corner of Osmond Terrace, in the old Kensington and Norwood Institute building, which was heritage-listed in 1981 on the South Australian Heritage Register. The institute, designed by government architect W. H. Abbott free of charge, and built in 1876, was one of many mechanics' institutes in Australia established during the 19th century. It was largely funded by its founding president, Sir Edwin Smith. In 1882 its collection, available for loan by subscriptions paid by members, was enhanced by books acquired from the Magill Institute after its demise. In 1883 extensions were added to the building, including a hall and reading room, and in 1895 it also had a musical program. In 1914 the library held 13,744 volumes, and 190 periodicals and newspapers, and an art school was opened in the building. In the 1950s the Institute supported the free lending of books, but fell into debt to the council. In 1977 the City of Kensington and Norwood acquired the building, and carried out renovations, retaining the library. In 1986 the Institute was dissolved, setting up a Friends of the Library group as the building becoming the responsibility of the council. The building was refurbished in period style and became Norwood Library.
The former Norwood Baptist Church, on the south-eastern corner of Church Avenue and The Parade (no. 134), designed by architect James Cumming, built in 1869 by Charles Farr and opened in January 1870, was heritage-listed on the SA Heritage Register in 1982. Its classical style was particularly influenced by the Metropolitan Tabernacle in Newington Butts in London, where influential Baptist preacher Charles Spurgeon used to preach. The building contains one of the most significant church organs in South Australia, installed in 1882. Its use as a church ceased and for some time it housed the Mary Martin Bookshop, but that closed in the 2010s and has since been used as a restaurant.

Churches

Saint Ignatius Church is a Catholic parish church, built after land at the north-eastern corner of William and Queen Streets was purchased by the Society of Jesus (more commonly referred to as Jesuits) in 1869 and the church built in Italianate style and opened in August 1870.

Saint Bartholomew's on Beulah Road in Norwood, also known as St Bart's Norwood, is "an Anglican church in the evangelical tradition that participates as a member of the Anglican Communion". It was for some years part of the Grace Anglican Network (created by St Bart's in 2016) with St Matthew's Church, Marryatville, but  is again independent. 

The Unitarian Meeting House at 99 Osmond Terrace is an independent, self-governed church "affiliated with the worldwide Unitarian and Unitarian-Universalist free church movements".

Schools
 Norwood Primary School, Osmond Terrace, which was designed and built by the same architect and builder as the Norwood Baptist Church, architect James Cumming and builder Charles Farr, as Norwood Public School in 1871.
 Saint Ignatius' College, junior campus

Transport
Several Adelaide Metro bus routes serve the suburb. These are the main routes running through or adjacent to Norwood :
H30, H33: Magill Road
H20, H21, H22, H23, H24, N22: The Parade
140, 141,142: Kensington Road
300: Suburban Connector (Portrush Road)
In addition to these, there are a number of school services running during term-time, and special services to Adelaide Oval for big events.

Notable residents
 Reginald Blundell, politician
 C.J. Dennis, writer
 Bill Denny, politician
 Don Dunstan, former Premier of South Australia
 Antonio Giannoni, first Italian settler in South Australia
 May Gibbs, writer
 Max Harris, poet
 Lionel Hill, politician
 Mary MacKillop, Australia's first beatified saint
 Mary Martin, bookseller
 Sir Edwin Thomas Smith 
 Catherine Helen Spence, women's rights campaigner
 Alexander Tolmer, former police officer and police commissioner
 Stanley Price Weir, public servant and Australian Army officer

See also
 Electoral district of Norwood
 List of Adelaide suburbs

 Norwood Swimming Pool (in neighbouring Kensington)
 Woodroofe, a soft drink company

References

External links

Suburbs of Adelaide
Green bans